Donald Preston Fambrough (October 19, 1922 – September 3, 2011) was an American college football player and coach. He served two stints as the head football coach at the University of Kansas, from 1971 to 1974 and 1979 to 1982, compiling a record of 36–49–5.

Early life
Fambrough was born on October 19, 1922 in Longview, Texas to Ivey and Willie Whittington Fambrough. He attended Longview High School.

College football and military career
Fambrough played college football at Texas in 1941 and 1942 before serving in the United States Army Air Corps during World War II. After returning home from the war, he and his wife moved to Lawrence, Kansas. While in Lawrence, he chose to play football at the University of Kansas. Following his college career, he was drafted by the Chicago Cardinals (now known as the Arizona Cardinals) with the 276th overall selection in the 1945 NFL Draft.

Coaching career
Fambrough's first coaching job was at Kansas as assistant from 1948 to 1953. After that, he served as an assistant at East Texas State University, now known as Texas A&M University–Commerce and  the Municipal University of Wichita, now known as Wichita State University. Fambrough returned to Kansas as assistant coach under Jack Mitchell in 1958. He served as the head football coach at Kansas from 1971 to 1974 and again from 1979 to 1982 and compiled a 36–49–5 record as a head coach.

Later life
Fambrough remained involved in Kansas football leading up to his death, and would occasionally take part in team practices. The school dedicated a bench overlooking Memorial Stadium to him in 2007. Fambrough is known for his hatred of rival Missouri and gave an annual anti-Missouri speech to the football team before each Border War game.

Personal life
Fambrough married his wife, Delfred Few, on October 4, 1941. Del, who taught English for many years at Lawrence High School, preceded him in death on November 17, 2001. The couple had two children, sons Robert and Preston.

Death
Farmbrough died September 3, 2011 at his home in Lawrence, Kansas from head injuries sustained in a fall. He was survived by two children, four grandchildren, and one great-grandchild.

Head coaching record

See also
 List of college football head coaches with non-consecutive tenure

References

1922 births
2011 deaths
Kansas Jayhawks football coaches
Kansas Jayhawks football players
Second Air Force Superbombers football players
Texas A&M–Commerce Lions football coaches
Wichita State Shockers football coaches
Longview High School alumni
People from Longview, Texas
Players of American football from Texas
Accidental deaths from falls
Accidental deaths in Kansas
United States Army Air Forces personnel of World War II